The 2013–14 season of the Women's BeNe League is the second season of the Belgium and Netherlands' women's football top level league. The defending champion is FC Twente. The season started on 30 August 2013 and is played in a single division contrary to last season.

Originally planned as a 16 team league, one team withdrew before the season and another one withdrew during the season. Thus 14 teams made the final standings.

With six matches to spare Standard Liège already was set as the best placed Belgian side. The league was won by Twente for the second time in a row.

Format
The format with a national stage first and a second joint stage was discarded. The seven Dutch and seven Belgian teams played a double round-robin in which played each other two times, thus each team played 26 matches.

Teams
The league shall be played by eight Dutch and eight Belgian teams. Eight Belgian teams got a licence for the league, some teams need to for file some obligations. Two club did not return in the League, Zulte Waregem did not apply for a license and Beerschot AC didn't get one due to problems of the club in the male league. Shortly before the start Belgium side K. St-Truidense VV did withdraw from the season.

At 21 January the female soccer club FC Utrecht went bankrupt. The team is out of competition and all games played are taken from the scoreboard. They played their last game on 24 January. Royal Antwerp also left the BeNe League for financial reasons after the season.

Standings
All teams play in a single group this season. The best placed Belgium and Dutch team qualify for the Champions League. All games played by Utrecht have been deleted from the table. They stood in 11th place after 16 matches, when they were removed from the table.

League table

Results

Topscorers
Miedema won the topscorer award with 39 goals.

References

External links
Official website

BeNe League
BeNe League
1
BeNe League